Jamboree Road is a  long major arterial road through Orange County, California, running through the cities of Newport Beach, Irvine, Tustin, and Orange.

Route description
The southern terminus of Jamboree Road is at Bayside Drive, immediately before Balboa Island. Its name changes to Marine Avenue as it makes the very short journey over the water that separates Balboa from Newport Beach. The road enters Irvine after the intersection with MacArthur Boulevard and continues into the Irvine urban core after the I-405 interchange. At Barranca Parkway, Jamboree Road becomes a freeway, with grade-separated intersections and limited right-of-way. As a freeway, Jamboree has exits at Warner Avenue, Edinger Avenue, and Walnut Avenue. After splitting with SR 261, Jamboree Road intersects I-5 and bisects the Irvine/Tustin Marketplace, the north side being Tustin and the south side being Irvine. It proceeds north through the foothills, crossing the Loma Ridge alongside SR 261 (the Eastern Transportation Corridor toll road) to its northern terminus in the City of Orange, at the intersection with Santiago Canyon Road (County Route S18).

Jamboree Road is heavily used by commuters who work at the Irvine Urban Core districts such as the IBC (Irvine Business Center) and the Irvine Towers.

History

William H. Spurgeon III, a board member of the Orange County Council of the Boy Scouts arranged for the Irvine Company to offer part of the Irvine Ranch as the site for the 1953 National Scout Jamboree. The event was held where Newport Center and Fashion Island now sit. It was the third national jamboree, the first to be held west of the Mississippi River, and had 50,000 scouts from all 48 states and 16 foreign countries. Thousands of tents were pitched in the area accessible only by a muddy two-lane trail called Palisades Road (part of which is now the southern end of Bristol Avenue). The road was soon paved, and later the name was changed to Jamboree Road.

The current route of Jamboree Road follows the courses of four originally unconnected roads – these were, from south to north, the original stretch of Jamboree that extended from the present-day course of Bristol Street to Pacific Coast Highway, San Joaquin Road, Myford Road, and Peters Canyon Road.

Future
Currently, Jamboree Road terminates at Santiago Canyon Road. Plans in the future with the city of Anaheim and The Irvine Company on the "Mountain Park" neighborhood call to extend Jamboree Road to Weir Canyon Road with an at-grade intersection. In addition, the plans call for Weir Canyon Road to be extended to SR 241 with a tolled exit and for Gypsum Canyon Road to be extended to Weir Canyon Road. The Jamboree extension would have a brief run through Irvine Regional Park and would run parallel to SR 241. The route would serve as an alternate route for drivers who use SR 55 and Imperial Highway (via Cannon Street) in Orange, which usually are congested during peak hours, and such an extension would reduce congestion along those roads.

Along with this project, the cities of Anaheim and Yorba Linda as well as Caltrans call for select toll lanes on SR 241 to connect with SR 91's toll lanes, which would be parallel to the proposed Weir Canyon Road exit and Mountain Park and would improve the congestion faced at the northern terminus on SR 241 when merging east.

However in 2014, the Irvine Company donated 55,000 acres of land (including portions in the city of Anaheim) to the county of Orange to be preserved as open space. As a result, these projects may have been scrapped or delayed.

Major intersections

References

Streets in Orange County, California
Scouting in popular culture
Southern California freeways